The 2022 Asia Rugby Championship was the sixth tri-nations series of rugby union matches for the top-level Asia Rugby nations. Due to impacts of the COVID-19 pandemic, the series was cancelled in both 2020 and 2021.

The teams competing were Hong Kong, South Korea and Malaysia. Hong Kong were the defending champions, having won in 2019. The format of the tri-nations series was a double round-robin where the three teams play each other twice on a home and away basis. The team finishing on top of the standings at the end of the series was declared the winner.

This competition works as an Asian qualifier for the 2023 Rugby World Cup. The winner of the competition plays with Tonga to determine the participant for the 2023 Rugby World Cup.
Division 3 Central 1 was played from 3 to 6 July in Bishkek, Kyrgyzstan. The losers of the matches on 3 July advance to the 3rd place match and the winners to the final on 6 July. The Asia Rugby Championship Division 3 West will be played in Tehran, Iran from 29 September to 3 October. Iran, Lebanon and Qatar are expected to participate. Originally, it was planned to take place from 9 to 14 May.

Teams
The teams involved, with their world rankings prior to the tournament in brackets:

Fixtures

For the details of the matches, refer to 2023 Rugby World Cup – Asia qualification.

Play-off

Final

See also 
 2023 Rugby World Cup – Asia qualification

References

External links  

 Official website

2022 in Asian rugby union
2022 rugby union tournaments for national teams
2022
International rugby union competitions hosted by South Korea
rugby union
2022 in Malaysian sport
rugby union 
Rugby union events postponed due to the COVID-19 pandemic
June 2022 sports events in South Korea
July 2022 sports events in South Korea